Back o' Cairns: The Story of Gold Prospecting in the Far North is a 1958 autobiographical book by Ion Idriess. It is based on his adventures looking for gold in the Cape York Peninsula.

References

External links
Back o' Cairns at AustLit

1958 non-fiction books
Books by Ion Idriess
Australian autobiographies
Angus & Robertson books